The Durupınar site is geological formation of  made of limonite on Mount Tendürek, adjacent to the village of Üzengili in eastern Anatolia or Turkey.

The size and shape of the formation led to its promotion by some believers as the petrified ruins of the original Noah's Ark.  Geologists assert that it is an entirely natural formation but have nominated it as (geological) heritage.  The site is near several officially unnamed peaks, though locals call one of the nearby peaks Cudi Dağı in Turkish, and Çîyaye Cûdî in Kurdish, which David Fasold linked to Al Cudi, the place named in the Quran as the final resting place of Noah's Ark. Some researchers place Mount Judi in another location farther south, near the Turkish-Iraqi border.

Discovery and exploration

According to local reports, heavy rains combined with three earthquakes exposed the formation from the surrounding mud on May 19, 1948. It was discovered by a Kurdish shepherd named Reshit Sarihan. It was subsequently identified by Turkish Army Captain Ilhan Durupınar—for whom it was subsequently named—in a Turkish Air Force aerial photo while on a mapping mission for NATO in October 1959. Durupınar informed the Turkish government of his discovery and a group from the Archeological Research Foundation which included George Vandeman, Ilhan Durupınar, and Arthur Brandenberger, professor of photogrammetry, surveyed the site in September 1960. After two days of digging and dynamiting inside the "boat-shaped" formation, the expedition members found only soil and rocks. Their official news release concluded that "there were no visible archaeological remains" and that this formation "was a freak of nature and not man-made".

The site was then ignored until 1977, when it was rediscovered and promoted by self-styled archaeologist and amateur explorer Ron Wyatt. Throughout the 1980s, Wyatt repeatedly tried to interest other people in the site, including ark hunter and former astronaut James Irwin and creationist John D. Morris, neither of whom was convinced the formation was the Ark. In 1985, Wyatt was joined by David Fasold and geophysicist John Baumgardner for the expedition recounted in Fasold's The Ark of Noah. As soon as Fasold saw the site, he exclaimed that it was a shipwreck. Fasold brought along state-of-the-art ground-penetrating radar equipment and a "frequency generator", set it on the wavelength for iron, and searched the formation for internal iron loci (the latter technique was later compared to dowsing by the site's detractors). Fasold believed the team found the fossilized remains of the upper deck and that the original reed substructure had disappeared. In the nearby village of Kazan (formerly Arzap), they examined so-called drogue (anchor) stones that they believed were once attached to the ark.

Creationist commentators, such as Andrew Snelling in the Creation Ministries International journal Creation, wrote that "there are no scientific principles employed" in the "so-called frequency generator" used by Wyatt's team. He called it a "gadget, which is generally advertised in treasure-hunting magazines, not scientific journals" with "brass welding rods being used in essence, as divining rods, similar to the use of a forked stick to search for water."

Fasold asserted in his 1988 book that locals call one of the peaks near to the Durupınar site al Cudi (Turkish Cudi Dagi, Kurdish Çîyaye Cûdî) and linked this to the Mount Judi named in the Quran as the final resting place of Noah's Ark. The assertion is controversial and not well supported by local toponymy. After a few expeditions to the Durupınar site that included drilling and excavation in the 1990s, Fasold began to have doubts that the Durupınar formation was Noah's ark. He visited the site in September 1994 with Australian geologist Ian Plimer and concluded that the formation was not a boat. He surmised that ancient peoples had erroneously believed the site was the ark.  In 1996, Fasold co-wrote a paper with geologist Lorence Collins titled "Bogus 'Noah's Ark' from Turkey Exposed as a Common Geologic Structure", which concluded that the boat-shaped formation was a natural stone formation that merely resembled a boat. The same paper pointed out that the "anchors" were local volcanic stone. The abstract reads:
A natural rock formation near Dogubayazit, Turkey, has been misidentified as Noah's Ark. Microscopic studies of a supposed iron bracket show that it is derived from weathered volcanic minerals. Supposed metal-braced walls are natural concentrations of limonite and magnetite in steeply inclined sedimentary layers in the limbs of a doubly plunging syncline. Supposed fossilized gopherwood bark is crinkled metamorphosed peridotite. Fossiliferous limestone, interpreted as cross cutting the syncline, preclude the formation from being Noah's Ark because these supposed "Flood" deposits are younger than the "Ark." Anchor stones at Kazan (Arzap) are derived from local andesite and not from Mesopotamia.

In April 1997, in sworn testimony at an Australian court case, Fasold repeated his doubts and noted that he regarded the claim that Noah's ark had been found as "absolute BS".

Others, such as fellow ark researcher David Allen Deal, reported that before his death, Fasold returned to a belief that the Durupınar site might be the location of the ark. His close Australian friend and biographer June Dawes wrote:
He [Fasold] kept repeating that no matter what the experts said, there was too much going for the Durupınar site for it to be dismissed. He remained convinced it was the fossilized remains of Noah's Ark.
In 2011, the Grand National Assembly of Turkey granted jurisdiction over Noah's ark works specifically to a 5-professor Cultural Center Board of Directors from Ağrı İbrahim Çeçen University, as having precedence at the Durupınar site, overriding the Ministry of Culture and Tourism’s Immovable Cultural and Natural Assets High Council. In 2014 and 2019, ground penetrating radar surveys discovered that walls made of limonite stones form several right angles.

Arzap drogue stones

The Arzap drogue stones are a number of large standing stones found near the Durupınar site by amateur archaeologist Ron Wyatt with the aid of David Fasold and others. Fasold interpreted the artifacts as drogues, stone weights used to stabilize the Ark in rough seas, because they all have a chamfered hole cut at one end as if to fasten a rope to them, and his reading of the Epic of Gilgamesh, the Babylonian mythical account of the flood, suggested to him that such stones were used.

Drogue stones were the equivalent of a storm anchor on ancient ships. They have been found in the Nile and elsewhere in the Mediterranean area, and like the stones found by Wyatt and Fasold, they are heavy and flat with a hole for tying a line at one end. Their purpose was to create drag in the water or along shallow sandy bottoms:  the stone was attached to one end of a boat, and the drag produced would cause the bow or stern to face into the wind and wind-blown waves.

A geological investigation of samples from the stones, published by geologist Lorence Collins in co-authorship with their original discoverer David Fasold, found that they are of local rock and thus could not have been brought from Mesopotamia, the Ark's supposed place of origin. Similar stones found throughout ancient Armenia are recognised as pagan "holy stones" converted to Christian use by the addition of crosses and other Christian symbols. Many are found in Christian cemeteries, as these were.

See also
 Mountains of Ararat
 Searches for Noah's Ark

References

Further reading

Books

Documentaries

External links
 Noah's Ark Search: Durupinar
 Snopes: Noah's Ark Discovery
 Noah's Ark Deluxe Hotel & Spa in Vokolida, Cyprus

Pseudoarchaeology
Geography of Ağrı Province
Doğubayazıt
Noah's Ark